The JFF Champions Cup, known since 2009 as the Flow Champions Cup, is an annual knockout tournament in Jamaican football. The modern tournament was established during the 1990–91 season and is contended between the 12 Red Stripe Premier League clubs and the 14 Parish league champions

The current cup holders are Reno F.C., having defeated Montego Bay United 4–3 in the 2014 Flow Champions Cup Final. The title is Reno's third overall win in the competition.

Winners

NBS Federation (FA) Cup
1990/91 : Olympic Gardens 1–0 Hazard United
1991/92 : Seba United
1992/93 : Olympic Gardens
1993/94 : Harbour View F.C.
1994/95 : Reno F.C.
1995/96 : Reno F.C. 1–0 Arnett Gardens
1996/97 : Naggo Head F.C. 1–0 Hazard United
1997/98 : Harbour View F.C. 1–0 Waterhouse F.C. (asdet)
1998/99 : Tivoli Gardens F.C. 2–0 Violet Kickers F.C.
1999/00 : Hazard United 1–0 Wadadah F.C.
2000/01 : Harbour View F.C. 3–0 Wadadah F.C.
2001/02 : Harbour View F.C. 2–1 Rivoli United F.C.
2002/03 : Hazard United 1–0 Harbour View F.C.
2003/04 : Waterhouse F.C. 2–1 Village United F.C.

Red Stripe Champions Cup
2004/05 : Portmore United F.C. 3–1 Harbour View F.C.
2005/06 : Tivoli Gardens F.C. 3–2 Portmore United F.C. (aet)
2006/07 : Portmore United F.C. 2–1 Boys' Town F.C. (aet, 4–3 pen)

City of Kingston (COK) Co-operative Credit Union Champions Cup
(COK took over as competition sponsors at the end of the Red Stripe Sponsorship in 2007)

2007/08 : Waterhouse F.C. 2–0 Tivoli Gardens F.C.

Flow All-Island Champions Cup
(Flow took over as main competition sponsors, in conjunction with Sportsmax and JNBS, at the beginning of 2009)

2008/09 : Boys' Town F.C. 3–0 Tivoli Gardens F.C.
2009/10 : Boys' Town F.C. 3–2 Humble Lions F.C.
2010/11 : Tivoli Gardens F.C. 3–0 St. George's S.C.
2011/12 : 
2012/13 : Waterhouse F.C. 2–2 Tivoli Gardens F.C. (aet, 3–1 pen)
2014 : Reno F.C. 4–3 Montego Bay United F.C.

References

External links
Jamaica - List of Cup Winners, RSSSF.com

Football competitions in Jamaica
Jamaica